The Northwest Mexico leopard frog (Lithobates magnaocularis) is a species of frog in the family Ranidae endemic to Mexico. This predominantly aquatic frog inhabits temporary or permanent pools in shrublands and mesquite forests. It might be threatened by droughts.

It ranges along the Pacific slope of the Sierra Madre Occidental and adjacent coastal plain from southern Sonora state to southwards to the Río Grande de Santiago valley, where it occurs from sea level to 470 meters elevation.

See also
List of amphibians of Mexico

References

Lithobates
Endemic amphibians of Mexico
Taxonomy articles created by Polbot
Amphibians described in 1974
Sonoran–Sinaloan transition subtropical dry forest
Sinaloan dry forests